The Beijing U5 or previously the Senova D50 is a compact sedan produced by BAIC under the Senova (Shenbao 绅宝) brand and later the Beijing brand. The electric version is called the EU5, and was branded as the BJEV or BAIC EU5 before being rebadged as the Beijing EU5. The U5 and EU5 both received a facelift in 2021 and was renamed to U5 plus and EU5 Plus sold under the Beijing brand.

First Generation (2014–2017)

Originally unveiled as the Beijing Auto C50E, the first generation Senova D50 debuted on the 2014 Beijing Auto Show, and was launched on to the China car market in H2 2014. The C50E was planned to be sold under the Senova brand name with the original designation being D150. Prices of the D50 starts from 74,800 yuan to 119,800 yuan. The engine is mated to a 5-speed manual gearbox or CVT.

BJEV EU260/ EU400 (Electric Version)
Originally the Beijing Auto Senova EV300, the electric car based on the Beijing Auto Senova D50 sedan was later renamed to EU under the BJEV brand. Beijing Auto previewed an EV300 concept on the 2015 Shanghai Auto Show, with a new and more aerodynamic front DRG compared to the D50 that it was based on. The EU260 EV debuted on the 2015 Guangzhou Auto Show in China. After the rebranding, the EU260 is manufactured by BAIC BJEV, a subsidiary of the Beijing Auto Industry Corporation (BAIC) that makes electric cars. The EU series includes two different trim levels with different electric range including the BJEV EU400 and BJEV EU260 with the BJEV EU400 discontinued after the second generation D50 was launched.

Second Generation  (2018–present)

The second generation Beijing Auto Senova D50 was unveiled on the 2017 Shanghai Auto Show in April 2017, with the initial market launch planned to be in June 2017. However, the launch of the second generation Beijing Auto Senova D50 for the Chinese car market was later postponed to be on November 8 with prices ranging from 67,900 yuan to 96,900 yuan. Power of the second generation D50 comes from a 1.5-litre inline-four petrol engine producing  and  mated to a 5-speed manual gearbox or a CVT automatic gearbox.

As of 2020, the second generation model was later renamed to Beijing U5 after the launch of the revamped Beijing brand.

Beijing U5 Plus
The U5 received a facelift for the 2021 model year called the U5 Plus. The Beijing U5 Plus debuted during the 2021 Shanghai Auto Show featuring slightly revised front and completely redesigned rear. The interior is equipped with a 7 inch display on the center console and a 12.3 inch high resolution dashboard display.

Transmission options include a 5-speed manual transmission, a 6-speed manual transmission, and CVT gearbox.

Beijing/BJEV EU5 (electric version)
Same as the first generation Beijing Auto Senova D50 sedan, the second generation D50 also spawned an electric version manufactured and sold under the BJEV brand. The electric version of the second generation D50 was also sold under the EU series, and this time it was sold alongside the first-generation-D50-based EU260 as the EU5 replacing the also first-generation-D50-based EU400.

2020 rebadge
As of 2020, following the rebranding of the Beijing brand, the BJEV EU5 was rebadged with the Beijing brand while the name remains unchanged, fitting into U-themed sedan range as an electric variant of the Beijing U5 sedan. Prices ranges from 132,900 yuan to 161,900 yuan. The EU5 is powered by a single electric motor good for 218 PS (215 hp /160 kW) and 300 Nm (221 lb-ft) of torque.

Beijing EU5 Plus (2021)
The all-electric Beijing EU5 received a facelift that debuted during the 2021 Auto Shanghai under a new name called the EU5 Plus. The facelift sports a charging port that now resides in a front fender instead of the front fascia. Further design tweaks are in line with the U5 Plus petrol-powered version facelift, which are in the areas of the trunk lid, slimmer taillights, and C-shaped headlights with rounded details. The EU5 Plus cabin features two touchscreens, redesigned seats, restyled steering wheel, air deflectors, and HVAC.

References

External links 

 BAIC Official site
 Official Senova D50 Website

D50
Cars introduced in 2014
Compact cars
Front-wheel-drive vehicles
Sedans
Vehicles with CVT transmission
Cars of China
Production electric cars